Cheryl Anne Gibson (born July 28, 1959), is a former competitive swimmer from Canada who won the silver medal in the women's 400-metre individual medley at the 1976 Summer Olympics in Montreal, Quebec.

She held the Alberta provincial record in the 400-metre individual medley for 30 years, before it was broken in December 2008 by a 16-year-old Edmonton high school student. Gibson claimed six national titles as a college swimmer at Arizona State University. In 1979 she won the 200 back and 400 free relay, in 1979 she won the 400 free relay and in 1981 she was a national champion in the 200 back, 400 IM and 400 medley relay. Inducted in 1995, Gibson is a proud member of the Sun Devil Hall of Fame.

Gibson currently works as a tax attorney in Edmonton.

See also
 List of Olympic medalists in swimming (women)
 List of World Aquatics Championships medalists in swimming (women)
 List of Commonwealth Games medallists in swimming (women)

References

External links 
 Cheryl Gibson at Swimming Canada
 
  (archive)
 
 
 

1959 births
Living people
Canadian female backstroke swimmers
Canadian female butterfly swimmers
Canadian female medley swimmers
Commonwealth Games gold medallists for Canada
Medalists at the 1976 Summer Olympics
Olympic silver medalists for Canada
Olympic swimmers of Canada
Swimmers from Edmonton
Swimmers at the 1975 Pan American Games
Swimmers at the 1976 Summer Olympics
Swimmers at the 1978 Commonwealth Games
Swimmers at the 1979 Pan American Games
Swimmers at the 1982 Commonwealth Games
World Aquatics Championships medalists in swimming
Pan American Games silver medalists for Canada
Pan American Games bronze medalists for Canada
Olympic silver medalists in swimming
Commonwealth Games medallists in swimming
Pan American Games medalists in swimming
Arizona State Sun Devils women's swimmers
Medalists at the 1975 Pan American Games
Medalists at the 1979 Pan American Games
20th-century Canadian women
21st-century Canadian women
Medallists at the 1978 Commonwealth Games
Medallists at the 1982 Commonwealth Games